The Irish in America is an American silent film produced by Sid Films and distributed by Lubin Manufacturing Company. It was directed by Sidney Olcott with him and Valentine Grant in the leading roles.

Cast
 Valentine Grant - Peggy O'Sullivan
 Charles McConnell - Father O'Hara
 Sidney Olcott - Dan Murphy
 Laurene Santley - His Aunt
 Arthur Donaldson - Kerry Boy

Production notes
The film was shot in Beaufort, County Kerry, Ireland, during summer 1914.

References
 Michel Derrien, Aux origines du cinéma irlandais: Sidney Olcott, le premier oeil, TIR 2013.

External links

  The Irish in America website dedicated to Sidney Olcott

1915 films
Silent American drama films
American silent short films
Films set in Ireland
Films shot in Ireland
Films directed by Sidney Olcott
Lubin Manufacturing Company films
1915 short films
1915 drama films
American black-and-white films
1910s American films